Krajów may refer to the following places in Poland:
Krajów, Lower Silesian Voivodeship (south-west Poland)
Krajów, Masovian Voivodeship (east-central Poland)